Tugstsogt Nyambayar (born 23 June 1992) is a Mongolian professional boxer who held the IBO featherweight title in 2019 and challenged for the WBC featherweight title in 2020. As an amateur, he won silver medals at the 2009 World Championships and 2012 London Olympics. As of June 2020, he is ranked as the world's seventh best active featherweight by The Ring and the Transnational Boxing Rankings Board.

Amateur career
He won the silver medal at the 2009 World Amateur Boxing Championships. After that, Nyambayar won the silver medal at the 2012 London Olympics, losing to the Cuban boxer Robeisy Ramírez by a score of 14:17 in the final.

Professional career
In 2015, he signed with the manager/adviser Al Haymon and made his professional boxing debut in March of that year. Nyambayar made his professional debut against Gabriel Braxton on 13 March 2015, and won the fight by a first-round knockout. He amassed an 8–0 record during the next two years, with all of those victories coming by way of stoppage.

Nyambayar made his first step-up in competition on 18 November 2017, when he faced the undefeated Harmonito Dela Torre. He won the fight by unanimous decision, the first decision win of his professional career, with two judges scoring the fight 78–73 in his favor and the third judge scoring it 79–73 for Nyambayar. Nyambayar then faced the one-time WBC featherweight title challenger Óscar Escandón on 26 May 2018. He won the fight by a third-round technical knockout. Escandón was knocked down five times by the midway point of the third round, which forced referee Keith Hughes to wave the fight off.

Nyambayar faced the former WBA interim and IBO featherweight champion Claudio Marrero in a WBC featherweight title eliminator on 26 January 2019, at the Barclays Center in New York City. Aside from the bout being a title eliminator, the vacant IBO featherweight belt was on the line as well. Nyambayar won the fight by unanimous decision, with scores of 114–113, 115–112 and 116–111. Marrero had a strong start to the bout, but Nyambayar began to take over from the fifth round onward. On 23 October 2019, the reigning WBC featherweight champion Gary Russell Jr. was ordered to make a mandatory title defense against Nyambayar. The fight was booked as the event headliner of a February 8, 2020, Showtime card that took place at the PPL Center in Allentown, Pennsylvania. Russell Jr. won the fight by unanimous decision, with scores of 118–110, 117–111 and 116–112.

Nyambayar was booked to face Cobia Breedy on 19 September 2020, in yet another WBC title eliminator. Nyambayar won the fight a narrow split decision. Two judges scored the fight 114–112 and 114–113 in his favor, while the third judge scored the bout 115–111 for Breedy. Breedy was knocked down in both the first and second round. Instead of waiting for another WBC title shot at featherweight, Nyambayar opted to move up to super-featherweight in order to challenge the WBA interim champion Chris Colbert. Colbert won the fight by unanimous decision, with scores of 118–110, 117–111 and 118–110. Colbert utilized his height and reach advantage to great effect, keeping Nyambayar at bay with the jab for the majority of the fight. He landed 112 jabs, while the much shorter Nyambayar managed to land only 20 jabs himself.

Nyambayar returned to featherweight, after suffering his second professional loss, and was booked to face Sakaria Lukas. The fight was ruled a split draw, with scores of 96–94, 95–95 and 94–96. The major point of contention after the fight was a knockdown in round eight, which referee Eddie Claudio failed to call. Had the knockdown been called, Lukas would've won the bout by majority decision.

Professional boxing record

References

External links
 

1992 births
AIBA World Boxing Championships medalists
Boxers at the 2010 Asian Games
Boxers at the 2012 Summer Olympics
Boxers at the 2014 Asian Games
Featherweight boxers
Flyweight boxers
Living people
Medalists at the 2012 Summer Olympics
Mongolian male boxers
Olympic boxers of Mongolia
Olympic medalists in boxing
Olympic silver medalists for Mongolia
Sportspeople from Ulaanbaatar
Asian Games competitors for Mongolia